Vice Admiral Paul Golden Gaffney II, USN (Ret.), (born May 30, 1946) was the seventh president of Monmouth University in West Long Branch, New Jersey, from 2003 to 2013, becoming president emeritus August 1, 2013.

Gaffney graduated from the United States Naval Academy in 1968. Upon graduation, he was selected for immediate graduate education and received a master's degree in Ocean Engineering from The Catholic University of America in Washington, D.C. He completed a year as a student and advanced research fellow at the Naval War College, graduating with highest distinction. He completed an M.B.A. at Jacksonville University. The University of South Carolina, Jacksonville University, and The Catholic University of America have awarded him honorary doctorates.

He was president of the National Defense University from 2000 to 2003. Admiral Gaffney was the Chief of Naval Research with responsibility for science and technology investment for the Navy and Marine Corps from 1996 to 2000 and Commander of Naval Oceanography and Meteorology, from 1994 to 1997.  He commanded the U.S. Naval Research Laboratory, from 1991 to 1994. In 2001 he was appointed by President George W. Bush to the United States Commission on Ocean Policy, and served through the full term of the Commission until 2004. In August 2009, Gaffney was named the chair of the Ocean Research Advisory Panel (ORAP), a panel created by statute to advise federal agencies regarding ocean science and management matters. In 2012 he co-chaired the Decadal Review of the US Ocean Exploration Program. In October 2014, he was appointed as the first chair of new statutory Ocean Exploration Advisory Board (OAEB), serving until 2017. He served as a member of the National Academies of Science, Engineering and Medicine's Gulf of Mexico Research Program Advisory Board from 2015 to 2019.

Gaffney's naval career spanned over three decades including duty at sea, overseas, and ashore in executive and command positions. He served in Japan, Vietnam, Spain, and Indonesia. While a military officer, his career focused on oceanography.

He is the eponym of Gaffney Ridge, an undersea ridge in the South China Sea, 220 miles west of the Philippines (located at Latitude 13° 23' 00" N and Longitude 118° 32' 00" E). Gaffney also became the namesake of a supercomputer at the Department of Defense Supercomputing Resource Center at the John C. Stennis Space Center, in Hancock County, Miss., when he was honored by the Naval Meteorology and Oceanography Command (NMOC) on January 25, 2019.

Gaffney is the recipient of Defense and Navy Distinguished Service Medals, Legions of Merit (4), Bronze Star (w/”V”), the Naval War College's J. William Middendorf Prize for Strategic Research, and the Potomac Institute for Policy Studies Navigator Award, the Aquarium of the Pacific Ocean Conservation Award, and has been inducted into the Naval Meteorology and Oceanography Command Hall of Fame. He has served on several boards of higher education and was a member of the Ocean Studies Board of the United States National Research Council. He is a director of Diamond Offshore Drilling Inc., and currently serves as a Fellow of the Urban Coast Institute at Monmouth University. In 2010, he was elected to the National Academy of Engineering for technical leadership in naval research and development and its impact on U.S. defense, ocean policy, and the Arctic. He has chaired National Academies’ Committees on: assessment of hydrokinetic energy, domestic transportation of energy fluids, and understanding and predicting the Gulf of Mexico Loop Current. and chaired a National Academies consensus study on the Gulf of Mexico Loop Current.

Gaffney retired from Monmouth University in August 2013. His contributions to the success of Monmouth University and its athletic programs during his tenure were noted in a February 2016 retrospective. The University’s competition basketball court is named in his honor as "Gaffney Court."

Following his retirement from Monmouth University, Gaffney has remained active in academia, and was the guest speaker at the hooding ceremony for master's and doctoral graduates of the Arnold School of Public Health at the University of South Carolina in May 2014.

More recently, Gaffney co-authored a March, 2020, editorial with Jesse H. Ausubel in response to the economic effects of the coronavirus on maritime and coastal industries, arguing for increased investment from the United States in the Blue Economy. He is currently counselor to the Dean of Engineering and Computing at the University of South Carolina. He was selected in September 2020 as a member of National Academies’ Committee on Defense Research at Historically Black Colleges and Universities and other Minority Serving Institutions.

CNA Military Advisory Board

Vice Admiral Gaffney served on the CNA Military Advisory Board,[8] the first group of retired generals and admirals to examine the national security implications of climate change. Founded in 2006 by Sherri Goodman, the CNA Military Advisory board brought together military leaders from the United States Army, Navy, Air Force, and Marine Corps. The landmark report of the CNA Military Advisory Board, National Security and the Threat of Climate Change, established the concept of climate change as a “threat multiplier.”. In the CNA’s 2007 report, Vice Admiral Gaffney states, “... the defense and intelligence communities have extraordinary amounts of data… If climate change is, in fact, a critical issue for security, then the military and intelligence communities should be specifically tasked to aggressively find ways to make their data, talent, and systems capabilities available to American efforts in understanding climate change signals. They’ve done this in the past. And I’d love to see them able to do this more often in the future.

References

Sources
National Defense University
Potomac Institute Navigator Awards
J. William Middendorf. Prize for Strategic Research
US Board on Geographic Names
Consortium for Ocean Leadership

External links

Executive Order creating Governor’s Commission to Support and Enhance New Jersey’s Military and Coast Guard Installations.
Commissioners' Biographies at United States Commission on Ocean Policy
US Institute of Peace
A Commanding Presence 6/27/2008
The Admiral on Campus May-June 2011
Monmouth University Welcomes New President 8/1/2013

Living people
Jacksonville University alumni
Monmouth University faculty
Catholic University of America alumni
United States Naval Academy alumni
United States Navy vice admirals
Presidents of the National Defense University
1946 births
People from Attleboro, Massachusetts
Military personnel from Massachusetts